Lyell Meadow is a meadow, in the region of Tuolumne Meadows, in Yosemite National Park.


Geography
Lyell Meadow divides into Lower-Upper Lyell Canyon Meadow, Upper Lyell Meadow, and Lower Lyell Meadow. Lower-Upper Lyell Meadow, is smaller than Upper Lyell Meadow, but is a large meadow encompassing .

See also
 Dana Meadows
 Lyell Canyon
 Mount Lyell

References

External links and references

 Equine trekking, through Lyell Meadow

 

Landforms of Yosemite National Park
Canyons and gorges of the United States